In ancient Greek literature, an eidolon (plural: eidola or eidolons) is the spirit-image of a living or dead person; it is a shade or phantom look-alike of the human form.

Eidolon may also refer to:

Companies
 Eidolon Publications, a small press publisher based in North Perth, Western Australia
 Eidolon Books, the book publishing arm of the company
 Eidolon (magazine) (1990–2000), a periodical that was published by the company

Culture
 James Bond 007: Eidolon, a James Bond comic book by Dynamite Entertainment
 Eidolon I, a 2006 speculative fiction anthology edited by Jonathan Strahan and Jeremy G. Byrne
 Eidolon, an online journal for scholarly writing about classics and antiquity founded by Donna Zuckerberg

Music
 Eidolon (band), a heavy metal band
 Eidolon (album), an album by black metal band Dark Fortress
 Eidolon, a 2017 album by guitarist Allan Holdsworth
 "Eidolon", a track and single by Karnivool from their 2013 album Asymmetry
 "Eidolon", a track by Erra from their 2021 self-titled album

Video games
 Eidolon (video game), a video game from 2014 by Ice Water Games
 The Eidolon, a computer game from the 1980s by Lucasfilm Games
 Eidolons, a type of Summoned Monster in several Final Fantasy games
 Eidolon, the main antagonist in the video game Hexen II
 The Plains of Eidolon and the Eidolons, an open world area and a class of bosses respectively in the online game Warframe

Other uses
 Eidolon (bat), a genus of bats

See also 
 Apparition (disambiguation)